Huzi may refer to:

 Huzi Ward, Dodoma Rural District, Dodoma Region, Tanzania
 Huzi, Iran, a village
 Huzi, tiger-shaped urinals in Chinese culture

See also
 Fuji (disambiguation) for places sometimes romanized as Huzi